Penicillium antarcticum is an ubiquitous, endophytic fungus species of the genus Penicillium. Penicillium antarcticum produces the polyketide compounds antarone A and antarone B.

It was originally discovered on the Windmill Islands off Antarctica, thus its name.

See also
List of Penicillium species

References

Further reading
 

Fungi described in 1999
antarcticum